The Daily Breeze is a 57,000-circulation daily newspaper published in Hermosa Beach, California, United States. It serves the South Bay cities of Los Angeles County. Its slogan is "LAX to LA Harbor".

Early history 

The paper was founded as the weekly The Breeze in 1894 by local political activist S. D. Barkley and first served the local Redondo Beach community. Coverage eventually spread to other coastal cities, and by 1922, it had become a daily publication. In 1928, the Daily Breeze was purchased by Copley Press. The competition went out of business in 1970 (The Torrance Herald, 1913–1969).

Modern history 

Like most of the newspaper industry, the Daily Breeze has suffered its share of hardships, with the rise of free news on the Internet and the competitive Los Angeles media market. It merged with the (San Pedro) News-Pilot in 1999.

In 2005, it added to its circulation numbers through the purchase of two local weeklies, The Beach Reporter and Palos Verdes Peninsula News. In 2003, it created another weekly, More San Pedro, in the Harbor Area.

In December 2006, the paper was sold to the Hearst Corporation in a complex transaction that left the paper under the day-to-day control of Dean Singleton's MediaNews Group and its subsidiary, the Los Angeles Newspaper Group (LANG). Singleton announced that he would fold the paper into the LANG operations, but not cut salaries. Singleton will eventually come to own the Daily Breeze under a 2007 plan to acquire ownership of the paper as part of a swap with Hearst in which Hearst would trade some California papers and the St. Paul Pioneer Press for an increased stake in Singleton's non-California operations.

In 2008, the paper ceased producing its weekly supplement, More San Pedro. Nine staff members were laid off at the same time including four reporters, a web editor, and a newsroom assistant.

In 2015, the Daily Breeze won two major awards for its series of investigative reports, throughout 2014, regarding a financial scandal in the Centinela Valley Union High School District. In March, the paper won a Scripps Howard National Journalism Award for Community Journalism for the investigation, and in April the Pulitzer Prize for Local Reporting.

In Popular Culture 
Film Pineapple Express and television show Zeke & Luther have filmed at the Daily Breeze's previous headquarters location in Torrance, California.

References

Further reading 

 
 
 

Daily newspapers published in Greater Los Angeles
Mass media in Torrance, California
Mass media in Los Angeles County, California
MediaNews Group publications
Manhattan Beach, California
Publishing companies established in 1894
1894 establishments in California
Copley Press publications
Digital First Media